Brendan Carroll (born 1970) is an Irish businessman and retired hurler who played as a left wing-back for the Tipperary senior team.

Carroll joined the team during the 1993-94 National League and was a regular member of the team for just four seasons. During that time he failed to claim any honours at senior level.

At club level Carroll is a one-time county club championship medalist with Thurles Sarsfields.

Carroll is co-founder and managing director of recruitment company e-Frontiers. Prior to setting up e-Frontiers, Brendan worked at VISION Consulting for over 11 years having joined as a graduate. With VISION Consulting he delivered IT consultancy expertise from programming, analysis, business design through to project and programme management across numerous industry sectors including financial services, insurance, telecoms and sports/entertainment.

Carroll holds a B.Comm (UCD), MBS (Smurfit School of Business - UCD) and a Diploma in IT (NUI Maynooth).

References

1970 births
Living people
Thurles Sarsfields hurlers
Tipperary inter-county hurlers